The following Queensland Cup honours, excluding the Duncan Hall Medal, are awarded at the end of each regular season at the Queensland Rugby League's annual presentation evening. The Duncan Hall Medal is awarded after the Grand Final.

Petero Civoniceva Medal
The Petero Civoniceva Medal is awarded to the Queensland Cup player voted as the best and fairest over the entire season. After each game, the referees award three votes to the best player, two votes to the second-best player, and one vote to the third-best player. Formerly known as The Courier Mail Medal, in 2018, the medal was renamed after former Australian and Queensland representative Petero Civoniceva.

Duncan Hall Medal
Since 2007, the man of the match in the Queensland Cup Grand Final has been awarded the Duncan Hall Medal. The medal is named in honour of ARL Team of the Century member Duncan Hall, who played 24 games for Queensland and 22 games for Australia between 1948 and 1955.

Representative Player of the Year

Coach of the Year

Rookie of the Year

XXXX People's Choice Award
The XXXX People's Choice Award is given to the player who polls the most votes from fans. All 14 Queensland Cup clubs nominate one player to be in the running for the award. The award was discontinued after 2017.

Top Point Scorer

Top Try Scorer

Team of the Year

2015

2016

2017

2018

2019

2020
Not awarded

2021

2022

See also
Queensland Cup
Queensland Residents rugby league team

References

Queensland Cup